Josef Ian Scott (born November 8, 1981) is an American former college and professional football player who was a nose tackle in the National Football League (NFL) for six seasons during the 2000s.  Scott played college football for the University of Florida, and thereafter, he played professionally for the Chicago Bears, Philadelphia Eagles and San Diego Chargers of the NFL.

Early years 

Scott was born in Greenville, South Carolina in 1981.  He attended Gainesville High School in Gainesville, Florida, where he played high school football for the Gainesville Purple Hurricanes and he was a member of the Purple Hurricanes' 1999 Florida state championship basketball team.  Scott was a member of the National Honor Society and the valedictorian of his graduating class in 2000.

College career 

Scott accepted an athletic scholarship to attend the University of Florida in Gainesville, where he majored in industrial engineering and played for coach Steve Spurrier and coach Ron Zook's Florida Gators football teams from 2000 to 2002.  After starting for the Gators in 2001 and 2002, he was a second-team All-Southeastern Conference (SEC) selection both seasons.  After his junior year, Scott decided to forgo his final season of NCAA eligibility and entered the NFL Draft.

Professional career 

After being released by the Bears following the 2006 season, Scott was signed to a one-year contract by the Philadelphia Eagles on May 3, 2007, but was placed on injured reserve before the start of the season and did not appear in a regular season game during .  On April 29, 2008, Scott was signed by the Carolina Panthers.  He was released on August 20.

On September 23, 2008, Scott was signed by the San Diego Chargers after the team released cornerback DeJuan Tribble. On October 14, 2009, he was re-signed by the Chargers after the team released safety Clinton Hart. He was released on June 21, 2010.

In his six-season NFL career, Scott played in sixty-five games and started forty of them.  He totaled 112 tackles, two fumble recoveries and an interception.

See also 

 List of Chicago Bears players
 List of Florida Gators in the NFL Draft
 List of Philadelphia Eagles players

References

External links 
  Ian Scott – Florida Gators player profile
  Ian Scott – San Diego Chargers player profile

1981 births
Living people
American football defensive tackles
Carolina Panthers players
Chicago Bears players
Florida Gators football players
UCF Knights football coaches
Gainesville High School (Florida) alumni
Players of American football from Gainesville, Florida
Sportspeople from Greenville, South Carolina
Philadelphia Eagles players
Players of American football from South Carolina
San Diego Chargers players